NBBL may refer to:

National Bank of Belize
Nepal Bangladesh Bank